Vampire Diary is a 2007 horror film directed by Mark James and Phil O'Shea, produced by Michael Riley and Margaret Matheson, and starring Anna Walton. It was first released in the United Kingdom by Peccadillo Pictures.

Cast
 Anna Walton 
 Morven Macbeth 
 Jamie King (actor)
 Kate Sissons
 Justin McDonald 
 Keith-Lee Castle

Awards
Best Film Milan International Film Festival (Michael Riley and Margaret Matheson)
Best Actor Milan International Film Festival (Anna Walton)
Best Cinematography Milan International Film Festival (Nemone Mercer)
Best Editing Milan International Film Festival (Mark Atkins and Mark James)

External links

2007 films
2007 horror films
British horror films
British LGBT-related films
Lesbian-related films
LGBT-related horror films
2007 LGBT-related films
2000s English-language films
2000s British films